Gogolin Formation – Triassic geologic formation, hitherto named the Gogolin Beds, is the lowermost lithostratigraphical unit of the Lower Muschelkalk in the Silesian-Cracow Upland (S Poland, Central Europe), underlain by the Upper Buntsandstein (Lower Triassic) carbonates and overlain by the Górażdże Formation (Middle Triassic) carbonates.

Name

Historical name coming from Gogolin, a small town in south Poland, where the Gogolin Formation was described for the first time, and where the main stratotypes have been exposed (see section Stratotypes).

Age

The Late Olenekian or Early Aegean (Anisian) to Pelsonian (Anisian),.

Rocks

The formation is built of various carbonates which were deposited on a carbonate ramp.

Subdivision 

This Formation has recently been divided into four members, six beds, and two horizons:
 Zakrzów Crinoidal Limestone Member, which includes: a) Krapkowice Pelitic Limestone Bed – thin-bedded, wavy bedded and marly micritic limestones, b) Dąbrówka Bioclastic Limestone Bed – thick- to medium-bedded, cross-bedded crinoidal limestones, c) Podbór Bioclastic Limestone Bed – thin- to medium-bedded, graded, horizontally and cross-bedded bioclastic limestones and wavy-bedded micritic limestones;
 The Skała Marl Member – marls interbedded with micritic and bioclastic limestones; the lowermost part of this member is locally built of broken-up limestone beds and lumps which are covered by an intraformational conglomerate with small intraclasts – they are divided as Kocina Intraformational Conglomerate Bed;
 The Emilówka Cellular Limestone Member, which includes: a) Karłubiec Bioclastic Limestone Bed – massive, cross-bedded, thin- to medium-bedded bioclastic and micritic limestones, b) Otmęt Marly Limestone Bed – strongly porous, thin-bedded marly limestones that are, in fact, dedolomitized dolomites;
 Odrowąż marly limestone horizon – marls, thin- to medium-bedded, graded, cross-bedded and horizontally bedded bioclastic limestones and thin layers of platy and wavy bedded micritic limestones;
 Malnia limestone horizon – thin- to medium-bedded, graded, horizontally and cross-bedded bioclastic limestones, thin-bedded, platy and wavy-bedded micritic limestones;
 Ligota Hill Wavy-Bedded Limestone Member – wavy-bedded and crumpled micritic limestones intercalated with medium- to thin-bedded, graded, cross- and horizontally bedded, bioclastic limestones.

Stratotypes

Stratotypes are located at Gogolin and its vicinity, Błotnica Strzelecka and Ligota Dolna (southern Poland).

References

Literature 
 Assmann P., 1913 – Beitrag zur Kenntniss der Stratigraphie des oberschlesischen Muschelkalks. Jb. Preuss. Geol. Landesanst., 34: 658 – 671, Berlin.
 Assmann P., 1944. Die Stratigraphie der oberschlesischen Trias. Teil 2: Der Muschelkalk. Abhandlungen des Reichsamtes für Bodenforschung, Neue Folge, 208: 1–124.
 Kowal-Linka M. 2008. Formalizacja litostratygrafii formacji gogolińskiej (trias środkowy) na Śląsku Opolskim. Geologos 14 (2): 125–161 (and the references; the paper in Polish with English summary).
 Kowal-Linka M. 2009. Nowe jednostki litostratygraficzne w randze warstw w obrębie formacji gogolińskiej (trias środkowy) na Śląsku Opolskim. Geologia 35 (2): 153-174 (and the references; the paper in Polish with English summary).
 Kowal-Linka, M., Stawikowski, W., 2013. Garnet and tourmaline as provenance indicators of terrigenous material in epicontinental carbonates (Middle Triassic, S Poland), 291: 27–47.
 
 Niedźwiedzki R., 2000: Litostratygrafia formacji górażdżańskiej i formacji dziewkowickiej na Śląsku Opolskim. Prace Geologiczno-Mineralogiczne, 71, 1–72 (and the references; the paper in Polish with English summary).

External links 
 http://www.geologos.com.pl/archive.php?issue=11
 http://journals.bg.agh.edu.pl/GEOLOGIA/index.php?vol=2009-02
 

Geologic formations of Poland
Triassic System of Europe
Anisian Stage